Hossein Maleki is an Iranian football player, who currently plays for Persian Gulf Pro League club Saipa.

References

1990 births
Living people
Iranian footballers
Association football wingers
Shahin Bushehr F.C. players